Chung Dong-hoon (born 1932) also spelled Chung Dong-hun, is a former amateur boxer from South Korea. A native of Jeollanam-do, he graduated from Chosun University in Gwangju. He competed in the lightweight division at South Korea's April 1955 domestic Olympic national delegation qualifying tournament, and was victorious over Park Young-mu (朴英茂). The following year, he went to Melbourne, Australia to represent South Korea at the 1956 Summer Olympics in boxing, where he lost to Ján Zachara of Czechoslovakia. He went on to compete for South Korea in boxing at the 1958 Asian Games in Tokyo, Japan, where he captured the gold medal in the boxing lightweight division of the games after defeating Shinichiro Suzuki from Japan in the final.

References

1932 births
Boxers at the 1956 Summer Olympics
Asian Games medalists in boxing
Boxers at the 1958 Asian Games
Sportspeople from South Jeolla Province
Olympic boxers of South Korea
Living people
South Korean male boxers
Asian Games gold medalists for South Korea
Medalists at the 1958 Asian Games
Lightweight boxers